Mahendrasinh Shankarsinh Vaghela is an Indian politician from Gujarat. He was elected to the 12th Gujarat Legislative Assembly from Bayad in the 2012 Gujarat Legislative Assembly election as a member of the Indian National Congress (INC). He left INC in 2017 and joined Bharatiya Janata Party but returned to INC in October 2022.

He is a son of former state chief minister Shankarsinh Vaghela.

References

1964 births
Living people
Bharatiya Janata Party politicians from Gujarat
Indian National Congress politicians from Gujarat
People from Aravalli district
Gujarat MLAs 2012–2017
Gujarat University alumni